Carlo Lenci (15 July 1928 – 12 June 2000) was an Italian professional footballer who played as a midfielder in the 1940s and 1950s. He made 23 appearances in Serie A playing for Juventus and Lucchese as well as 118 appearances in Serie B for Legnano, Cremonese, Pisa and Monza.

References

1928 births
2000 deaths
People from Viareggio
Italian footballers
Association football midfielders
Juventus F.C. players
A.C. Legnano players
S.S.D. Lucchese 1905 players
U.S. Cremonese players
Pisa S.C. players
A.C. Monza players
Empoli F.C. players
U.S. Lecce players
S.S. Arezzo players
Serie A players
Serie B players
Serie C players
Sportspeople from the Province of Lucca
Footballers from Tuscany